The discography of Grizzly Bear includes five studio albums, five extended plays and eight singles.  Grizzly Bear is an American alternative rock band that was formed in 2002 by Ed Droste.  After the band's first studio album was released, Droste was joined by drummer Christopher Bear, bass guitarist and producer Chris Taylor, and guitarist Daniel Rossen.

Studio albums

Extended plays

Singles

Other releases
 "Don't Ask" from Horn of Plenty appeared on a 7" in Tomlab Records' Alphabet Series.  It was released on a 7" on November 14, 2005.
 Live from The Central Presbyterian Church, Austin, TX was released on March 19, 2009.

References

General

Specific

Discographies of American artists
Alternative rock discographies